The March Field Air Museum is an aviation museum near Moreno Valley and Riverside, California, adjacent to March Air Reserve Base.

History
The museum was founded in 1979 as March Air Force Base Museum. One of the first exhibits at the museum was a collection of art painted by Hazel Olson. It moved to a new location at the base's former commissary, where it reopened to the public in 1981. That same year, a B-29 was flown to the museum. The museum moved again in 1993 to its current location west of the runway along Interstate 215. Originally operated by the Air Force, the museum's operation was transferred to a nonprofit organization in 1996.

Exhibits

Outside, the museum has constructed Firebase Romeo Charlie, a reproduction of a Vietnam-era forward operating location.

Aircraft on display

The museum has over 100 aircraft on display.

 Aero Commander U-9A 52-6218
 Bell AH-1F Cobra 69-16416
 Bell P-39Q Airacobra – Composite
 Bell P-59 Airacomet 44-22614
 Bell OH-58 Kiowa 71-61668
 Bell UH-1B Iroquois 62-12537
 Bell UH-1D Iroquois 66-0925
 Bell UH-1F Iroquois 63-13143
 Bensen B-8M
 Boeing B-17G Flying Fortress 44-6393 "Starduster" – This aircraft served as Lt Gen Ira C. Eaker's personal transport.
 Boeing B-29A Superfortress 44-61669
 Boeing B-47E Stratojet 53-2275
 Boeing B-52D Stratofortress 55-0679 – This aircraft flew 175 combat missions in the Vietnam War.
 Boeing KC-97L Stratofreighter 53-0363
 Boeing KC-135A Stratotanker 55-3130 "Old Granddad"
 Cessna A-37 Dragonfly 71-0790
 Cessna T-37B Tweet 57-2316
 Cessna O-2A Skymaster 68-11067
 Cessna O-2B Skymaster 67-21465
 Consolidated PT-6A 30-385
 Convair C-131D Samaritan 54-2808
 Convair F-102A Delta Dagger 56-1114
 Douglas TA-4J Skyhawk
 Douglas A-26C Invader 44-35224
 Douglas EA-1E Skyraider 132789
 Douglas C-54Q Skymaster 56514
 Fairchild PT-19B
 Fairchild C-123K Provider 54-0612
 Folland Gnat E1076
 General Atomics MQ-1B Predator
 General Dynamics FB-111A Aardvark 68-0245
 Grumman YF-14A Tomcat 157990 – This aircraft was the 11th prototype F-14.
 Grumman HU-16E Albatross 1293
 Hughes OH-6A Cayuse 68-17252
 Lockheed C-141B Starlifter 65-0257
 Lockheed D-21B
 Lockheed P-38L Lightning – Replica
 Lockheed R5O-5 Lodestar 12473
 Lockheed SR-71A Blackbird 61-7975
 Lockheed T-33A Shooting Star 58-0513
 LTV A-7D Corsair II 69-6188
 Martin EB-57B Canberra 52-1519
 McDonnell F-101B Voodoo 59-0418
 McDonnell Douglas F-4C Phantom II 63-7693
 McDonnell Douglas F-4E Phantom II 68-0382
 McDonnell Douglas RF-4C Phantom II 63-7746
 McDonnell Douglas F-15 Eagle 76-0008
 Mikoyan-Gurevich MiG-15
 Mikoyan-Gurevich MiG-17
 Mikoyan-Gurevich MiG-19
 Mikoyan-Gurevich MiG-21
 Mikoyan-Gurevich MiG-23 0393215744
 MMIST CQ-10A Snowgoose
 Nieuport 11 – Scale replica
 Nieuport 11 – Scale replica
 North American TB-25J Mitchell 44-31032
 North American F-86H Sabre 53-1304
 North American F-86L Sabre 50-0560
 North American F-100C Super Sabre 54-1786
 North American SNJ-4 Texan 51360
 Northrop F-89J Scorpion 52-1949
 Northrop T-38A Talon 60-0593
 Northrop YA-9A 71-1368
 Piasecki H-21 Workhorse 53-4326
 Republic F-84C Thunderjet 47-1595
 Republic F-84F Thunderstreak 51-9432
 Republic F-105B Thunderchief 57-5803
 Republic F-105D Thunderchief 62-4383
 Sauser P6E – Replica
 Schweizer TG-2
 Sikorsky HH-34J Choctaw 148943
 Stearman PT-13D Kaydet 42-16388
 Stinson L-5 Sentinel
 Vultee BT-13A Valiant 41-21487
 Vultee BT-13A Valiant N54865 – This aircraft was converted to resemble an Aichi D3A Val Dive Bomber for the 1970 movie Tora! Tora! Tora!.
 Wright Flyer – Replica

Indoor exhibits
Indoor displays include:
A replica Wright Flyer
A section of a Boeing B-47 cockpit which was used in the filming of the 1955 film Strategic Air Command starring Jimmy Stewart. 
A movie played on a regular recurring schedule
A German 30mm cannon and jet engines
Missile and bomb cross-sections

Memorials
A memorial to War dogs.
The Distinguished Flying Cross National Memorial Act, signed July 25, 2014, designated the memorial at the museum in honor of current and former members of the Armed Forces who have been awarded the Distinguished Flying Cross as the Distinguished Flying Cross National Memorial. The national memorial was dedicated on October 27, 2010.
List of national memorials of the United States

In the media

Television
The March Field Air Museum was featured on an episode of Ghost Adventures in 2018. The team of paranormal investigators investigated paranormal claims of artifacts being thrown out of their glass cases by an unseen force while in the Main Hangar, voices of children who died with their mother from the flu when they lived on the property before the Restoration Hangar was built, and sounds of soldiers preparing for battle while in the Lockheed C-141 Starlifter display aircraft.

References

Notes

Bibliography

External links

 

Aerospace museums in California
Military in Riverside County, California
Museums in Riverside, California
Military and war museums in California
Museums in Riverside County, California
1979 establishments in California
Museums established in 1979
National Memorials of the United States